Ghasem Jafari is an Iranian director, writer, and film and television producer born on July 6,1969 in Tehran, Iran.

Biography 
His wife, Sedigheh Sehat, is a film and television producer. He has two children, Iran and Shahrzad, who are both artists.

He is a graduate of the Film Education Training Center and began his career in cinema in 1990 as the director of production of the film Disarmament and in the slaughterhouse of love as the deputy director of production.

Works

Publications/Writings

Serial Films 
 Cold Fever (TV series)
 My flower series
 Serial Kashaneh
 The third way series
 Serial Companion
 Red Line Series
 Sunny Night series
 Traveler from India
 Serial help me
 The Strange Serial
 The series is out of breath
 Life is a beautiful series

Movies 

 Ein Shin Qaf (2014)
 Parvangi (2011)
 Girls (2009)
 White and Black (2009)
 Majnoon Lily (2007)
 Corner of the heart
 Twilight (2006)
 Loser (2004)
 Dandelion (1995)
 Mehraban Month (1995)

References

External links 
 Ghasem Jafari at BFI.org
 
 Ghasem Jafari's films at radiotimes.com
 

Iranian film directors
Living people
1969 births
Iranian screenwriters
Iranian writers